Daniel Kenji Silva Matsunaga (born November 28, 1988) is a Brazilian model, actor, professional footballer, host and businessman. He became known in the Philippines by appearing in Cosmopolitan Philippines’ September 2009 "Cosmo Men" supplement. He was scouted in the Philippines as an actor and was first given TV drama projects on GMA Network. He also joined ABS-CBN's reality TV show Pinoy Big Brother and was declared as the PBB All-In big winner in 2014.

As a footballer he has played for Team Socceroo, Pachanga and Kaya in the United Football League (UFL) which was the top-flight football league in the Philippines during its existence. He will play for Maharlika Manila in the Philippines Football League starting the 2020 season.

Early life
Matsunaga was born in Brasilia, the capital of Brazil. His mother, Gerarda Silva, is a Brazilian of Portuguese, African, and Indigenous descent, while his father, Paulo Mitsuo Matsunaga, is of Japanese descent. He has a brother and a sister.

Career

Modelling and acting
Matsunaga started his career when he became a model for Cosmopolitan Philippines 'Cosmo Men' supplement.  His debut series on screen was on GMA-7's top rated drama series The Last Prince with co-stars Aljur Abrenica and Kris Bernal.
In 2012, he moved to TV5 for more TV shows and projects like Game N Go, Enchanted and Misibis Bay.

He went to ABS-CBN to be one of the celebrity judges for It's Showtime. On 17 May 2014, Matsunaga entered the Pinoy Big Brother house on Day 21 as the fourth celebrity and eighteenth official housemate of the Pinoy Big Brother: All In season.

On 24 August 2014, he was declared as the big winner of Pinoy Big Brother: All In.

In May 2017, Daniel Matsunaga was introduced as the first male endorser for Avon Philippines' Men's Club during the "Confidence is the New Sexy" campaign launch. He was chosen to be the endorser because he "reflects the Modern Gentleman who is a man of style, adventure, and confidence".

Football career
Matsunaga started playing football during his childhood and aspired to play for the Brazil national football team before he got involved in showbiz. He played for clubs in his native Brazil as well as in Hong Kong before playing in the Philippines. In the Philippines he had played for Team Socceroo, Pachanga, and Kaya.

He played in the now defunct United Football League (UFL) starting in Division 2 playing for Team Socceroo in 2011 playing with fellow model actor Fabio Ide. He then moved to Division 1 club Pachanga Diliman during the 2012 UFL Cup, before eventually moving to Stallion for the 2013 season. For the 2014 season he moved to Kaya.

In street football, he played for Team Naxional who secured qualification as the Philippine representatives at the Neymar Jr's Five Football Tournament by winning over Tondo in the final of the Philippine qualifying leg. The world final held in Brazil was contested by 53 other countries with Romania emerging as champions.

Matsunaga also became involved in the 7's Football League as a player.

He returned to domestic football, when he signed in to play with Philippines Football League newcomer Maharlika F.C. in August 2020. Although he was not part of the final lineup for the 2020 season for undisclosed reasons.

Personal life
Daniel Matsunaga is a Christian. He obtained permanent residency in the Philippines in December 2014 and had expressed intention to petition for Filipino citizenship.

Filmography

Television

Film

References

External links
 
 
 
 

1988 births
Living people
Brazilian male comedians
Brazilian expatriates in the Philippines
Brazilian people of French descent
Brazilian people of Japanese descent
Brazilian people of Portuguese descent
Brazilian people of Spanish descent
Brazilian male film actors
Brazilian footballers
Brazilian male television actors
Brazilian male models
Male actors from Brasília
Footballers from Brasília
Star Magic
Pinoy Big Brother contestants
Big Brother (franchise) winners
ABS-CBN personalities
TV5 (Philippine TV network) personalities
Kaya F.C. players
Team Socceroo F.C. players
Stallion Laguna F.C. players
Association football midfielders
Male actors of Japanese descent
Maharlika F.C. players